Pleșa may refer to several places in Romania:

 Pleșa, a village in Berești-Meria Commune, Galați County
 Pleșa, a village in the town of Bumbești-Jiu, Gorj County
 Pleșa, a village in Mănăstirea Humorului Commune, Suceava County
 Pleșa (Timiș), a tributary of the Timiș in Caraș-Severin County
 Pleșa, a tributary of the Jiul de Vest in Hunedoara County
 Pleșa, a tributary of the Horezu in Vâlcea County

See also 
 Pleși (disambiguation)
 Pleașa (disambiguation)
 Pleșoiu (disambiguation)
 Pleșești (disambiguation)